Ardy Larong (born December 14, 1980) is a Filipino former professional basketball player. He last played for the Philippine Patriots in the Asean Basketball League.

He was drafted by Alaska in the second round in the 2007 PBA draft but was left unsigned and the Purefoods Tender Juicy Giants tried him out and signed him. He is known for his defense and hustle. He was signed by the Sta. Lucia Realtors for the 35th PBA season. He played as an import for the Chang Thailand Slammers for the 2010-2011 season. After the Slammers' successful run, Larong moved back to the Philippines to play for the Misamis Oriental Meteors of the Liga Pilipinas.

References
Player Profile

1980 births
Living people
Basketball players from Agusan del Norte
Filipino men's basketball players
People from Butuan
Philippine Patriots players
Shooting guards
Small forwards
Magnolia Hotshots players
Sta. Lucia Realtors players
USJ-R Jaguars basketball players
Alaska Aces (PBA) draft picks